Lin Cheng-yi (born 1942) is a Taiwanese politician.

Lin is a native of Tainan. At the suggestion of Kuo Tien-tao, Lin moved to Australia after graduating from the Taipei Institute of Technology. He earned a doctorate at the University of New South Wales, and subsequently joined the faculty and administration, later moving to the University of South Australia, where he spent the majority of his career. Between 2002 and 2005, Lin returned to Taiwan to represent overseas Chinese in the Legislative Yuan, as a member of the People First Party. At the end of his term, Lin resettled in Australia, and in 2014, was named president of the Nan Tien Institute, a school operated by the Nan Tien Temple.

References

1942 births
Living people
Party List Members of the Legislative Yuan
People First Party Members of the Legislative Yuan
Members of the 5th Legislative Yuan
Taiwanese emigrants to Australia
University of New South Wales alumni
Taiwanese academic administrators
20th-century Australian educators
Academic staff of the University of New South Wales
Academic staff of the University of South Australia
National Taipei University of Technology alumni
Politicians of the Republic of China on Taiwan from Tainan
Heads of schools in Australia
21st-century Australian educators
21st-century Taiwanese educators
20th-century Taiwanese educators